is a hentai computer game and anime. Sexfriend focuses on the protagonist, Tomohiro Takabe, who has his first sexual encounter in the nurse's office after school with his classmate, Mina Hayase. He eventually desires a real romantic relationship, not just "friends with benefits". Another student, Kaori Nonomiya, sees Tomohiro and Mina having sex and runs off disappointed because she also loves Tomohiro. She eventually joins them in a threesome.

Cast
 Wasshoi Taro: Takabe Tomohiro
 Dynamite Ami: Mina Hayase
 Kanari Kanzaki: Kaori Nonomiya
 Erena Kaibara: Nurse Taeko Nonomiya
 Bokyle: Otoko, Additional Voices

Credits
 Kurige Katsura: Director, Screenplay, Storyboard
 Shida Tadashi: Animation Director, Character Designer
 Toru Yukawa: Music
 Ayumi Shimazu: Art Direction
 Kanashi Bari: Color Design
 Dynamite Ami: Theme Song Performer

References

Further reading
 Animeland Hors-Série #9: HS Q, February 2006

External links
 
 

2003 video games
2004 anime OVAs
Casual sex in fiction
Group sex
Eroge
Japan-exclusive video games
Video games developed in Japan
Windows games
Windows-only games